General Hay may refer to:

Alexander Leith Hay (1758–1838), British Army general
Andrew Hay (British Army officer) (1762–1814), British Army major general
Bob Hay (general) (1920–1998), Australian Army major general
Charles Craufurd Hay (1809–1873), British Army lieutenant general
James Hay (British Army officer) (died 1854), British Army lieutenant general
John H. Hay (1917–1995), U.S. Army lieutenant general
Lord John Hay (Scottish Army officer) (c. 1668–1706), British Army brigadier general
Lord Charles Hay (c. 1700–1760), British Army major general
William H. Hay (1860–1946), U.S. Army major general 
Charles Hay, 20th Earl of Erroll (1852–1927), British Army major general
George Hay, 8th Marquess of Tweeddale (1787–1876), British Army general

See also
General Hays (disambiguation)
General Hayes (disambiguation)